Oak Ridge Park is a  county park in Clark, New Jersey, United States, located on the border of North Edison, New Jersey managed by Union County. The park, formerly Oak Ridge Golf Course, was converted to a park in 2009.

The park is home to the historic Homestead Farm at Oak Ridge.

Park development
In 2009, the park was converted from the 80-year-old 18-hole Oak Ridge Golf Course. The conversion was met with opposition from local golfers.

The park features an archery range, the only one in Central Jersey.

Development of the park is expected to cost $10 – $20 million.

See also
Rahway River Parkway

References

External links
 Union County Archery Range

Clark, New Jersey
County parks in New Jersey
Parks in Union County, New Jersey